The 1885 Penn Quakers football team was an American football team that represented the University of Pennsylvania during the 1885 college football season. In its first year under head coach Frank Dole, the team compiled a 8–5 record.  Paul Thompson was the team captain.

Schedule

References

Penn
Penn Quakers football seasons
Penn Quakers football